Benjamin Franklin Marsh (November 19, 1835 – June 2, 1905) was a U.S. Representative from Illinois in the late 19th century to early 20th century. He was also a lawyer, soldier, agriculture manager, stock raiser, and Illinois State Railroad and Warehouse Commissioner.

Early life
Benjamin Marsh was born in 1835 in Warsaw, Illinois (Hancock County). He first studied law in Warsaw, and after attending law school was admitted to the bar in 1860. He continued to study law after the American Civil War until 1877, when he was elected Illinois State Representative.

Civil War
Benjamin enlisted into the 16th Illinois Infantry Regiment as a private. He was later commissioned as a colonel. Benjamin received the Purple Heart when he received a piece of shrapnel in the foot. He participated in battles such as Shiloh and Antietam. He served until 1866 and when the war ended he continued his law practices until 1877.

Government office
Benjamin Marsh first started his way into the Illinois Government office by becoming the Republican candidate for membership of the Illinois State Constitutional Convention and was elected. He served until 1869.

In 1877 he was elected as a Republican to the 45th, 46th and 47th Congress. (March 4, 1877 – March 3, 1883)

Marsh then became chairman for the Committee on Pensions, and was an unsuccessful candidate for reelection in 1882 to the 48th Congress.

Then, Marsh became delegate to the Republican National Convention in 1888; and was elected to the 53rd, 54th, 55th, and 56th Congresses, which he served March 4, 1893 – March 3, 1901.

He then became chairman on the Committee of the Militia (54th through 56th Congresses).

Marsh then was unsuccessful when he ran for reelection for the 57th Congress, but was successful when he ran for election to the 58th and 59th, which he served until his death.

Jobs
 U.S. Representative (1877–1883) (1893–1901) (1903–1905)
 Lawyer
 Agricultural Manager
 1889 State Railroad and Warehouse Commissioner 
 Delegate to the Republican National Convention

Death
Marsh died in office in 1905. He is buried at Oakland Cemetery in Warsaw, Illinois.

See also
List of United States Congress members who died in office (1900–49)

References

1835 births
1905 deaths
People from Warsaw, Illinois
Illinois lawyers
Union Army colonels
Republican Party members of the United States House of Representatives from Illinois
19th-century American politicians
Military personnel from Illinois